Moritz Michael Daffinger (25 January 1790 – 21 August 1849) was an Austrian miniature painter and sculptor.

Life
Daffinger was born in Vienna, the son of Johann Daffinger (1748–1796), a painter at the local Vienna Porcelain Manufactory. The eleven-year-old likewise was accepted as an apprentice and later went on to study at the Academy of Fine Arts, where he took painting lessons with Heinrich Füger. He returned to work at the factory as one of its leading painters. 

From 1809 he worked only on portraits, specializing in miniature painting on ivory, and small gouaches on paper. In 1812, he was employed as a portraitist by the Austrian Foreign Minister, Klemens von Metternich, and became curator of the extensive portrait collection of Metternich's third wife, Princess Melanie. In 1819, he painted a portrait of Metternich's daughter, Klementine, posed as the goddess Hebe. He was influenced by Jean-Baptiste Isabey and even more strongly by the English portrait painter Thomas Lawrence, who visited Vienna in 1819. In his late years, he concentrated on the painting of flowers.

Daffinger died in 1849 during a cholera epidemic in Vienna and was buried in the St. Marx Cemetery. In 1912, his remains were transferred to a grave of honor in the Vienna Zentralfriedhof. Daffinger left more than a thousand portraits, many of which were owned by the Austrian imperial House of Habsburg-Lorraine.

His portrait graced the obverse of the Austrian 20-schilling banknote that circulated until the introduction of the euro in 1999.

Gallery

External links

References

1790 births
1849 deaths
Austrian painters
Austrian male painters
Austrian sculptors
Austrian male sculptors
Artists from Vienna